Amy Ziering (born 1962 in Massachusetts) is an American film producer and director. Mostly known for her work in documentary films, she is a regular collaborator of director Kirby Dick; they co-directed 2002's Derrida and 2020's On the Record, with Ziering also producing several of Dick's films.

In 2013, she received an Academy Award nomination for Best Documentary Feature for producing the Dick-directed film The Invisible War.

Early life
Ziering was born in 1962. She is the daughter of Sigi Ziering, a Holocaust survivor, and Marilyn Ziering. She grew up in Beverly Hills, California. She graduated from Amherst College before pursuing graduate work at Yale University, where she studied with Jacques Derrida.

Career

Early career 
Ziering's first film, Taylor's Campaign (1998), directed by Richard Cohen, followed Ron Taylor, a homeless resident of Santa Monica, as he campaigned for the Santa Monica city council. Martin Sheen narrated.

Ziering then began work on Derrida (2002), a documentary about her former mentor, the French philosopher Jacques Derrida. She co-directed the film with Kirby Dick. It explores Derrida's life and work while questioning the limitations of biography. It won the Golden Gate Award at the 2002 San Francisco International Film Festival.

She next produced a feature narrative, The Memory Thief (2007), directed by Gil Kofman. The film chronicles the experiences of a young man who becomes involved in documenting the experiences of survivors of the Holocaust as his commitment turns into obsession and madness. Ziering collaborated with Dick again on Outrage (2009), a documentary about the lives of closeted gay politicians who legislate against gay rights, as well as the mainstream media's reluctance to report on this subject. It received an Emmy nomination for Outstanding Investigative Journalism.

The Invisible War
In 2012, she premiered The Invisible War at the Sundance Film Festival, where it received the Audience Award for Best Documentary Feature. The film examines the epidemic of rape in the United States Armed Forces, and has been heralded for exposing a culture of sexual abuse at Marine Barracks Washington. Several government officials have commented on the film's influence on policy, including Secretary of Defense Leon Panetta, who has said that the film convinced him to implement a wave of reforms designed to reduce the prevalence of military sexual assault.

The film's revelations have also been discussed in congressional hearings and spurred lawmakers to seek better safeguards for assault survivors. Senator Kirsten Gillibrand credits the film with inspiring her to introduce the Military Justice Improvement Act, which would establish an independent judiciary to oversee accusations of sexual assault in the armed forces.

Among other honors, The Invisible War received a nomination for Best Documentary Feature at the 85th Academy Awards and won Emmy Awards for Best Documentary Feature and Outstanding Investigative Journalism.

The Hunting Ground 
In 2015, The Hunting Ground premiered at the 2015 Sundance Film Festival. Produced by Ziering and written and directed by Dick, the documentary is about the incidence of sexual assault on U.S. college campuses and the failed response of college administrators. It was released on February 27, 2015, an edited version aired on CNN on November 22, 2015, and the DVD was released the week of December 1, 2015. It was released on Netflix in March 2016. Lady Gaga recorded an original song, "Til It Happens to You", for the film.

One day before the film's theatrical release, a bipartisan group of 12 U.S. senators, accompanied by the film's lead subjects, Annie Clark and Andrea Pino, reintroduced the Campus Accountability and Safety Act requiring universities to adopt standard practices for weighing sexual charges, and to survey students on the prevalence of assault.

The Hunting Ground was nominated for a 2016 Emmy Award for Exceptional Merit in Documentary Filmmaking and for the Producers Guild of America's Outstanding Producer of Documentary Theatrical Motion Picture award. It won the 2016 Stanley Kramer Award given to "a production, producer or other individual whose achievement or contribution illuminates and raises public awareness of important social issues.The Hunting Ground was also one of the five movies nominated in the Documentary category of the 2016 MTV Movie Awards.

The Bleeding Edge 
The Bleeding Edge premiered at the 2018 Tribeca Film Festival to rave reviews and received further critical acclaim after its worldwide release on Netflix on July 27, 2018. Currently at 100% on Rotten Tomatoes and a New York Times Critic's Pick of the Week, the documentary, written and directed by Dick and produced by Ziering and Amy Herdy, is a deep dive into the $400 billion medical device industry, where the filmmakers find shockingly lax regulations, corporate coverups and profit-driven incentives that put patients at risk daily.

The film's impact was felt immediately as a week before its release, The Bleeding Edge became a part of a national news story when Bayer removed the birth control device Essure from the U.S. market, one of the many devices heavily criticized and warned about in the film. Entertainment Weekly added it to its list of documentaries that have changed the world. The documentary received the George Polk Award for Medical Reporting—one of only a few documentaries to receive the journalistic award—and was nominated for a Peabody Award and the Grierson Award for Best Science Documentary.

On the Record 
On October 23, 2017, Dick and Ziering announced an upcoming film on equity, parity, abuse, and representation in Hollywood. They had begun working on this project while screening The Invisible War. In a statement to media, Ziering said, "Every time we screened that film in Hollywood, actors and executives would come up to us and say that they had had similar experiences right here. So we began working on this project and immediately found ourselves grappling with the same forces that had kept this story silenced for so long. Everyone was frightened about what would happen to their careers, and worried about whether they would be sued. Distributors were unwilling to fund or release the film, and few people were willing to talk on the record."

Once the Harvey Weinstein sexual abuse allegations went public, funding appeared through Impact Partners, which also financed The Hunting Ground and The Invisible War. Ziering said, "People at long last are speaking out in large numbers, and we feel this industry, and the country, is finally ready for an unflinching film about the reality of sexual assault and harassment in Hollywood."

On the Record, Dick and Ziering's film about sexual abuse allegations against Def Jam co-founder Russell Simmons, premiered to a standing ovation at the 2020 Sundance Film Festival. The film, which includes the voices of nine alleged survivors such as Drew Dixon, Sheri Sher, Sil Lai Abrams, Jenny Lumet, and Kelly Cutrone, has received critical acclaim. On review aggregator website Rotten Tomatoes, the film holds an approval rating of 99% based on 71 reviews. The site's critical consensus reads: "On the Record uses harrowing first-person accounts to powerfully and persuasively confront the entrenched sexism of an industry and its culture." On Metacritic, the film has a weighted average score of 84 out of 100, based on 22 critic reviews, indicating "universal acclaim".

Allen v. Farrow 
Dick and Ziering's first documentary series, Allen v. Farrow is a four-part series that examines the sexual assault allegation made against Woody Allen by his adopted daughter Dylan Farrow, who was seven when the abuse allegedly occurred. It follows the custody battle between Allen and his former partner Mia Farrow, his marriage to her adopted daughter Soon-Yi Previn, who is 35 years younger than Allen, and the events of subsequent years. The series premiered on HBO on February 21, 2021, with the last episode airing on March 14, 2021. On Rotten Tomatoes, the series holds an approval rating of 82% based on 56 reviews. On Metacritic, it has a weighted average score of 76 out of 100, based on 25 critics, indicating "generally favorable reviews".

RAINN announced that the series resulted in a nearly 20% increase in calls.

Not So Pretty
Ziering and Dick directed Not So Pretty, a four-part series about the beauty industry and harmful chemicals in products, narrated by Keke Palmer. It premiered on April 14, 2022, on HBO Max.

Personal life
Ziering has three daughters and resides in Brentwood.

Filmography

Awards and nominations

References

External links

Interview with Amy Ziering and Kirby Dick, January 2, 2015 Democracy Now!
Interview with Amy Ziering, June 9, 2016 Democracy Now!

Living people
People from Beverly Hills, California
Film producers from California
American documentary film directors
American documentary film producers
American people of German-Jewish descent
American people of Polish-Jewish descent
Yale University alumni
1962 births
People from Brentwood, Los Angeles
Documentary war filmmakers
Film directors from Los Angeles
American women documentary filmmakers
21st-century American women